Muhamad Rafie bin Mat Yaacob (born 2 July 1998) is a Malaysian professional footballer who plays as a forward.

References

1998 births
Living people
Malaysian footballers
Association football forwards
UiTM FC players
Malaysia Super League players